Muggeridge is a surname of English origin, and may refer to:

Douglas Muggeridge (1928–1985), British radio executive
Edward Muggeridge (1830–1904), British photographer
H. T. Muggeridge (1864–1942), British politician
Karl Muggeridge (born 1974), Australian motorcycle racer
Kitty Muggeridge (1903–1994), British writer 
Malcolm Muggeridge (1903–1990), British writer
Maureen Muggeridge (1948–2010), British geologist
Eadweard Muybridge (born Edward Muggeridge) (1830-1904), an English photographer
Muggeridge (Surrey cricketer) (fl. around 1780), cricket player

English-language surnames